Sherman Beverley "Shermie" White (May 12, 1923 – January 29, 1975) was a Canadian professional ice hockey centre who played four games in the National Hockey League with the New York Rangers.

External links

1923 births
1975 deaths
Canadian ice hockey centres
Ice hockey people from New Brunswick
New York Rangers players
New York Rovers players
People from Westmorland County, New Brunswick
Canadian expatriate ice hockey players in the United States